The Women's rhythmic individual all-around competition at the 2018 Mediterranean Games was held at the Pavelló Olímpic de Reus in Reus from 29 to 30 June.

Competition format

The competition consisted of a qualification round and a final round. The top ten gymnasts in the qualification round advance to the final round. In each round, the gymnasts perform four routines (ball, hoop, clubs, and ribbon), with the scores added to give a total.

Schedule
All times are Central European Summer Time (UTC+2)

Qualification

Alessia Russo of Italy finished in fourth position but did not qualify because a country can only enter two athletes in final.

Final

References

Rhythmic